In geometry, a (general) conical surface is the unbounded surface formed by the union of all the straight lines that pass through a fixed point — the apex or vertex — and any point of some fixed space curve — the directrix — that does not contain the apex.  Each of those lines is called a generatrix of the surface. 

Every conic surface is ruled and developable.  In general, a conical surface consists of two congruent unbounded halves joined by the apex.  Each half is called a nappe, and is the union of all the rays that start at the apex and pass through a point of some fixed space curve.  (In some cases, however, the two nappes may intersect, or even coincide with the full surface.) Sometimes the term "conical surface" is used to mean just one nappe.

This special case is often called a cone, because it is one of the two distinct surfaces that bound the geometric solid of that name. This geometric object can also be described as the set of all points swept by a line that intercepts the axis and rotates around it; or the union of all lines that intersect the axis at a fixed point  and at a fixed angle . The aperture of the cone is the angle .

A cylindrical surface can be viewed as a limiting case of a conical surface whose apex is moved off to infinity in a particular direction. Indeed, in projective geometry a cylindrical surface is just a special case of a conical surface.

Equations
A conical surface  can be described parametrically as
,

A right circular conical surface of aperture , whose axis is the  coordinate axis, and whose apex is the origin, it is described parametrically as

In implicit form, the same surface is described by  where

More generally, a right circular conical surface with apex at the origin, axis parallel to the vector , and aperture , is given by the implicit vector equation  where

or

where , and  denotes the dot product.

In three coordinates, x, y and z, a conical surface with an elliptical directrix, with apex at the origin, is given by this homogeneous equation of degree 2:

See also
Conic section
Developable surface
Quadric
Ruled surface

Euclidean solid geometry
Surfaces
Algebraic surfaces
Quadrics